Bartosz Tyszkowski (born 25 January 1994) is a Polish Paralympic athlete and he competes in F41-classification javelin throw and shot put events. He represented Poland at the 2012 Summer Paralympics in London, United Kingdom and at the 2016 Summer Paralympics in Rio de Janeiro, Brazil. At the 2016 Summer Paralympics, he won the silver medal in the men's shot put F41 event.

He won the gold medal in the men's shot put F41 event at the IPC Athletics World Championships both in 2013 and in 2015.

At the 2018 World Para Athletics European Championships in Berlin, Germany, he won the gold medal in the men's shot put F41 event and he also set a new world record of 14.04m.

References

External links 
 

Living people
1994 births
Place of birth missing (living people)
Athletes (track and field) at the 2012 Summer Paralympics
Athletes (track and field) at the 2016 Summer Paralympics
Medalists at the 2016 Summer Paralympics
Paralympic silver medalists for Poland
Paralympic medalists in athletics (track and field)
Paralympic athletes of Poland
Competitors in athletics with dwarfism
World record holders in Paralympic athletics
Polish male javelin throwers
Polish male shot putters
Medalists at the World Para Athletics European Championships
Medalists at the World Para Athletics Championships
21st-century Polish people
20th-century Polish people